Andriy Ihorovych Kiva; Andrei Igorevich Kiva (born 21 November 1989) is a Ukrainian (until 2014), Russian football midfielder. He plays for FC Sevastopol.

Career
In 2014, after the annexation of Sevastopol, Crimea to Russia, he became a Russian citizen.

In February 2015, he became a player of the FC Sevastopol, which performs in the Republican Football Federation of Crimea.

He played in the Russian Football National League for FC Neftekhimik Nizhnekamsk in 2016.

External links 
 Profile at Official Site FFU (Ukr)
 Profile on PFC Sevastopol Official Site (Rus)

1989 births
Living people
Sportspeople from Sevastopol
Ukrainian footballers
Association football midfielders
Ukraine student international footballers
Ukrainian footballers banned from domestic competitions
FC Hazovyk-KhGV Kharkiv players
FC Lokomotyv Dvorichna players
FC Sevastopol players
Naturalised citizens of Russia
Russian footballers
FC Sevastopol (Russia) players
FC KAMAZ Naberezhnye Chelny players
FC Sokol Saratov players
FC Neftekhimik Nizhnekamsk players
Crimean Premier League players